The Kisaragi Sho (Japanese きさらぎ賞) is a Grade 3 horse race for three-year-old Thoroughbreds run in February over a distance of 1800 metres at Kyoto Racecourse. The race is also known as the NHK Sho.

The race was first run in 1961 and was elevated to Grade 3 status in 1984. It was usually run at Chukyo Racecourse before being moved to its current venue in 1987. The race serves as a trial race for the Satsuki Sho. Past winers of the race include Special Week, Neo Universe, Tosen Ra and Satono Diamond.

Winners since 2000  

 The 2015 winner Rouge Buck was a filly.

 The 2021 race was run over 2000 metres at Chukyo.

Earlier winners

 1984 - Gold Way
 1985 - Ibuki Kaner
 1986 - Fumino Applause
 1987 - Tochino Ruler
 1988 - Meiner Frisse
 1989 - Nice Nice Nice
 1990 - Haku Taisei
 1991 - Shin Horisky
 1992 - Hishi Masaru
 1993 - Tsuji Utopian
 1994 - Samson Big
 1995 - Ski Captain
 1996 - Royal Touch
 1997 - Hiroki Gumo
 1998 - Special Week
 1999 - Narita Top Road

See also
 Horse racing in Japan
 List of Japanese flat horse races

References

Turf races in Japan